Maje may refer to: 

Camana language
Cavana language

See also
Maje (disambiguation)